Sportpark Laag Zestienhoven is a cricket ground in Rotterdam, the Netherlands.  The first recorded match on the ground came in 1963 when RG Inglese's XI played The Forty Club.  The ground later held six matches in the 1990 ICC Trophy.  The ground held a single Women's One Day International in 2003 when Ireland Women played Pakistan Women.

The ground is used by VOC Cricket Club.

References

External links
Sportpark Laag Zestienhoven at ESPNcricinfo
Sportpark Laag Zestienhoven at CricketArchive

Cricket grounds in the Netherlands
Sports venues in Rotterdam